Sean Chapman is an English actor. He played Frank Cotton in Clive Barker's Hellraiser, and its sequel, Hellbound: Hellraiser II. He also voiced the character Sgt. Michael Sykes (callsigned "Psycho") in Crysis in 2007 and in Crysis Warhead in 2008.

Filmography
Passion Flower Hotel (1978) - Rodney
Scum (1979) - James
Party Party (1983) - Sam Diggins
Underworld (1985) - Buchanan
Eat the Rich (1987) - Mark
The Fourth Protocol (1987) - Captain Lyndhurst
Hellraiser (1987) - Frank Cotton / Frank The Monster (voice) (UK release) (uncredited)
Hellbound: Hellraiser II (1988) - Frank Cotton / Frank The Monster (voice) / Skinless Frank (voice)
For Queen and Country (1989) - Bob Harper
Tangier Cop (1997) - Arthur Smith
The Sea Change (1998) - Rupert
One of the Hollywood Ten (2000) - Edward Dmytryk
Gangster No. 1 (2000) - Bent Cop
Joy Division (2006) - Harris
A Mighty Heart (2007) - US Journalist
Psychosis (2010) - Detective Sergeant

Television 

His television work is extensive, including leading roles in many single dramas and TV plays, including the films Made in Britain, CH4, and Contact.

One of his earlier television appearances was as Coleman, part of a kidnapping gang in the hard-hitting police drama The Professionals; episode The Acorn Syndrome (1980).
Other leading roles in television include The New Statesman (BBC), The Black and Blue Lamp (BBC), No Further Cause For Concern (BBC), Ellington (ITV), Peak Practice (ITV), Kavanagh QC (ITV), Midsommer Murders (ITV), Trial and Retribution V (ITV) and Murphy's Law (ITV). He has also featured in various episodes of French & Saunders and in Absolutely Fabulous. He appeared in the episode The Raven in the Foregate from the third series of Cadfael in 1997 as a medieval murder suspect and spy.

Chapman played Peter Tracey in the Doctor Who spin-off K-9 and Company in 1981 on BBC1. In 1995, he played Bonetti in Season 2, Episode 1 of Wycliffe.

Fiction
A Distant Prospect (2010) - novel
The Blood in the Moon (2012) - novel
Ms Derby Requires (2013) - four short stories
The Mason's Son (2017) - novel

Video games
Battle Engine Aquila (2003)
Crysis (2007) - Psycho
Crysis Warhead (2008) - Psycho
Crysis 3 (2013) - Psycho

References

External links 
 Official Site
 
 https://www.independent.co.uk/arts-entertainment/theatre-dance/features/interview-sean-chapman-777626.html
 http://www.guardian.co.uk/film/2005/aug/13/comment.features

English male film actors
English male television actors
English male voice actors
People from Greenwich
English writers
1961 births
Living people
Male actors from Kent